Caitlin Beverly Gerard (born July 26, 1988) is an American actress and filmmaker.

Early life 
Caitlin Beverly Gerard was born in Los Angeles on July 26, 1988. She attended the International School of Los Angeles, a private French K-12 school, and graduated from Malibu High School in 2006. She majored in English with a concentration in creative writing at UCLA.

Career
Gerard appeared in AMC Theatres' pre-show snipes, namely the "Coming Soon" and the "Magic Chairs" snipes, from 2009 to 2013. She played Amy Page in the MTV mockumentary series Zach Stone Is Gonna Be Famous (2013) and had a leading role in the first season of the drama series American Crime (2015). She has appeared in horror films such as Smiley (2012), The Wind (2018), and Insidious: The Last Key (2018).

Gerard co-wrote and directed the short comedy film I Lost My Mother's Ashes (2019). She is currently working on directing numerous music videos for various artists.

Filmography

Film

Television

References

External links

1988 births
People from Los Angeles
21st-century American actresses
American film actresses
American television actresses
Living people
Actresses from California
University of California, Los Angeles alumni